Glasgow Academy Boat Club is a rowing club on the River Clyde, based at the Glasgow Schools East boathouse, Glasgow Green, Glasgow. The club is affiliated to Scottish Rowing.

History
The club belongs to The Glasgow Academy where rowing is a performance sport. In recent years the club has experienced considerable success with 22 international medals, including two World Championships. The boathouse used by the school at weekends is the Glasgow Schools East boathouse in Glasgow Green, the facility is also used by the Glasgow Schools Rowing Club and the Glasgow University Boat Club. Rowing training during the week takes place at the Academy.

Honours

National champions

References

Sports teams in Glasgow
Rowing clubs in Scotland
Rowing clubs of the River Clyde
Glasgow Green